The 1937–38 NBL season was the inaugural season of the National Basketball League (NBL). The league was the evolution of the Midwest Basketball Conference, a league that had a duration of two years before becoming the NBL. The league launched with nine franchises, it was irregular because the teams were the ones that had to choose the day and the hour of the match, even the duration (four quarters of 10 minutes or three parts of 15 minutes) was chosen by the local team before the match. The season ended with the Akron Goodyear Wingfoots becoming the NBL's first championship team.

Standings

Eastern Division

Western Division

Awards 
 MVP: Leroy Edwards (Oshkosh)
 Coach of the Year: Lefty Byers (Akron Goodyear)
 Rookie of the Year: Bob Kessler (Indianapolis)

NBL-All First Team
 Leroy Edwards, Oshkosh All-Stars
 Scott Armstrong, Fort Wayne General Electrics
 John Wooden, Whiting Ciesar All-Americans
 Charlie Shipp, Akron Goodyear Wingfoots
 Chuck Bloedorn, Akron Goodyear Wingfoots

NBL-All Second Team
 Soup Cable, Akron Firestone Non-Skids
 Jack Ozburn, Akron Firestone Non-Skids
 Bob Kessler, Indianapolis Kautskys
 Vince McGowan, Whiting Ciesar All-Americans<
 Bart Quinn, Fort Wayne General Electrics

References 

 
it:National Basketball League 1937-1938